Risa Horowitz (born 1970) is a Canadian visual and media artist. Her works have been exhibited across Canada and internationally. Her work has been shown at Canada House in London, England, and is included in its permanent collection. She is currently an associate professor at the University of Regina, Saskatchewan, Canada.

Education
Horowitz received her Bachelor of Fine Arts in Interdisciplinary Fine Arts Studies in 1995 at York University, and completed her masters in Visual Arts in 2000 at the University of Saskatchewan. In 2012 she completed her PhD in Visual Arts at York University.

Career
She has lived and worked in seven different Canadian provinces and has taught critical issues for studio artists, photography, and digital imaging at York University and Grenfell Campus. She is currently an associate professor of Visual Arts and head of the Department of Visual Arts at the University of Regina, in Saskatchewan.

As an academic, Horowitz is interested in the ways in which information systems frame knowledge, and in practice-based scholarship and the shaping of art practice by university structures and expert/amateur distinctions.

In 2011, she co-founded the Working Group for Studio Art Practice and Research for the University Art Association of Canada with Annie Martin.

Works

Landscapes and Silence (2016) 
Landscapes and Silence] featuring Horowitz’s work Starfields and Fields (2016), was realized with the collaborative support of Edgar Pinto and exhibition co-curator Tanya Abraham of the Kashi Art Gallery and the Art Outreach Society (TAOS) in Kochi, Kerala.

Imaging Saturn (2016) 
Imaging Saturn (2016) is a multimedia installation that focuses on Saturn, its orbit, and the paths of the sun and surrounding stars. Incorporating aspects of participatory science and data visualization, the exhibit combines astronomy and astrophotography with mapping of the ecliptic, background stars, and Saturn, a mechanized orbiter (developed with Ray Peterson), kinetic sculptures, and video. It reflects an interest in Saturn going back to 2010. In that year, Horowitz had a transcendent experience while observing Saturn through a telescope for the first time. This led to the launch of the Imaging Saturn project, which involves tracking Saturn's movements for the entire period of its 29 year orbit from 2011 to 2040. This work was continued at least until 2016, although Horowitz also acknowledged that in practice she might not continue the project for the entire 29 years.

Blurry Canada (2011) 
During a road trip across Canada in 2010, Horowitz recorded 175 hours of continuous video and 20,000 images. Seventy-five chromogenic prints, and all 175 hours of video in a 13-day loop, were exhibited in her show Blurry Canada at Dunlop Sherwood Village Gallery in Regina in 2011. The exhibit was shown at the Art Gallery of Southwestern Manitoba in 2012.

Trio (2008) 
Trio is a multichannel video installation that shows Horowitz' efforts to  learn to play Franz Schubert's Piano Trio No. 2, a  trio for piano, cello and violin. Trio was presented at the Experimental Art Foundation in Adelaide, Australia, in 2008.

Trees of Canada (2007) 
For Trees of Canada Horowitz drew upon Canada's 2004 National Forest Inventory as an inspiration for examining indigenous and naturalized trees.
Her resulting series of acrylic paintings was exhibited in 2007 at the Profiles Gallery, St. Albert, Alberta, and in 2008 at MKG127 Gallery, Toronto, Ontario.  Twenty pieces from Trees of Canada (2007) were acquired by Department of Foreign Affairs and International Trade for the permanent collection of Canada House in London, England. Horowitz attended the unveiling, at which Queen Elizabeth II was present.

twitch (2003) 
twitch (2003) is a group exhibition curated by Risa Horowitz. It began as a two person exhibit which was orchestrated by the selection committee for regular programming at Ace Art inc. This hybrid collaboration consisted of five artists; David Rokeby’s Very Nervous System; Garnet Hertz’s Experiments in Galvanism; Nicholas Stedman’s The Blanket Project; Kevin Yates’ Untitled (Dying Bull) and other works; and Erika Lincoln’s Scale.

twitch invites the viewer to consider the simulated fantasy that technology and interactive media can provide throughout the exhibit. Horowitz describes the exhibit; “twitch is about comfort; thought; pleasure; mystery; learning; joy; fear; pain; the search for meaning; mythology and enabling myths; our place in the universe; loneliness”.

Melitzah (2000–2007) 
Melitzah (2000–2007) is an extensive vocal performance coupled with the Canadian Oxford Dictionary. Horowitz visualized every word in the dictionary with a waveform of her pronunciation of that word and documented her visualization in a set of 138 books and a website. Melitzah was selected for the FILE Electronic Language International Festival, São Paulo Brazil, in 2005.

girl before a mirror (2000) 
girl before a mirror (2000) is an MFA project completed at the University of Saskatchewan originally exhibited at the Gordon Snelgrove Gallery. It is based loosely on a 1932 painting of the same name by Pablo Picasso. Horowitz started with a catalog of photographic self portraits compiled between 1993 and 1999 in the Canadian communities of Toronto, French River, Windsor, Vancouver, and Saskatoon. The concept of a mirror is here being used as an analogue for a self portrait, with the idea that the portrait never perfectly reflects the actual person. Horowitz used the concept to explore a triple level of surveillance. She was surveilling herself through her own self portraits. By exhibiting them on the web and in galleries, she was allowing others to perform their own surveillance on her surveillance. Finally, since the web site recorded such things as search terms, she was able to do her own further surveillance of her audience through the way they interacted with her site.

Awards 
Horowitz was the recipient of the K.M. Hunter Artist Award in 2006.

Footnotes

Living people
Canadian multimedia artists
York University alumni
University of Saskatchewan alumni
Academic staff of the University of Regina
21st-century Canadian artists
21st-century Canadian women artists
1970 births